Tai Kek is a village in Pat Heung, Yuen Long District, Hong Kong.

Administration
Tai Kek is a recognized village under the New Territories Small House Policy.

See also
 Ho Pui and Ma On Kong, two nearby villages

References

Villages in Yuen Long District, Hong Kong
Pat Heung